The International Journal of Number Theory was established in 2005 and is published by World Scientific. It covers number theory, encompassing areas such as analytic number theory, diophantine equations, and modular forms.

According to the Journal Citation Reports, the journal has a 2020 impact factor of 0.674.

Abstracting and indexing 
The journal is abstracted and indexed in Zentralblatt MATH,  Mathematical Reviews,  Science Citation Index Expanded, and Current Contents/Physical, Chemical and Earth Sciences.

External links 
 

Publications established in 2005
Mathematics journals
World Scientific academic journals
English-language journals